Amos Lee is the debut album by American singer and songwriter Amos Lee. The album was released by Blue Note on March 1, 2005, and produced by Lee Alexander, who played bass for Norah Jones.

Track listing
All tracks written by Amos Lee.
"Keep It Loose, Keep It Tight" – 3:08
"Seen It All Before" – 4:15
"Arms of a Woman" – 4:11
"Give It Up" – 2:38
"Dreamin'" – 2:54
"Soul Suckers" – 2:49
"Colors" – 2:40
"Bottom of the Barrel" – 2:00
"Black River" – 3:31
"Love In the Lies" – 3:22
"All My Friends" – 4:18

Personnel
Amos Lee - guitar, vocals; background vocals (4)
Lee Alexander - bass (2, 3, 5, 8, 9, 10), pulp drum (9), producer, mixing
Fred Berman - drums (3, 5, 7, 11), background vocals (4)
Kevin Breit - acoustic guitar (8), mandolin (8), resonator guitar (9)
Adam Levy - electric guitar (2, 3, 5, 10), background vocals (4)
James Gadson - drums (2), background vocals (4)
Larry Gold - cello (1, 6), string arrangements (6)
Zara Bodé - background vocals (2)
Devin Greenwood - Hammond B3 (2, 4, 10), background vocals (2), Wurlitzer (3, 11)
Norah Jones - piano (1, 7), background vocals (7), Wurlitzer (7)
Alexandra Leem - viola (6)
Jaron Olevsky - bass (1, 7, 11)
Dan Rieser - drums (1, 10)
Nate Skiltes - mandolin (7)
Chris Thomas - bass (4)

Credits:
Barrie Maguire - Producer ("All My Friends"), Engineer
Steve Mazur - Assistant Engineer
Clay Patrick McBride - Cover Photo
Billy Joe Walker, Jr. - Engineer
Eli Wolf - A&R
Jessica Novod Berenblat - Art Direction
Matt Boynton - Engineer
Greg Calbi - Mastering
Chris Cofoni - A&R
Danny Markowitz - A&R
Bill Eib - Management
Perry Greenfield - Product Manager
Denise Guerin - Photography
Gordon Jee - Creative Director
Danny Kopelson - Engineer, Mixing
Jeff Kramer - Management

Charts

Weekly charts

Year-end charts

References

External links
Official artist website
Album website preview
 

2005 debut albums
Amos Lee albums
Blue Note Records albums
Albums produced by Lee Alexander (musician)